Mohammad Manzarpour (born 8 March 1972)  is a British-Iranian television journalist. He was BBC Persian’s Middle East correspondent based in Jerusalem between 2008 and 2011. He is the former executive editor of VOA-PNN

Background 
Manzarpour was born in Tehran. He joined Tehran Times (English Language Daily) in May 1998. He was promoted to Economic Editor by the current editor in chief of the paper. Manzarpour joined the BBC shortly after graduation in 2002. After 6 year in the Persian section of the World Service, he moved to BBC Persian Television.

In 2008, he was deployed to Jerusalem, then on to the 2008 Gaza War as BBC Persian correspondent. From 2010 to 2011, he covered the Arab Spring in Egypt, and Tunisia.

References
The content of this article is based on that in its Persian equivalent.

Living people
BBC newsreaders and journalists
Iranian journalists
Iranian emigrants to the United Kingdom
1972 births